The 2010 African Judo Championships were the 31st edition of the African Judo Championships, and were held in Yaounde, Cameroon from 15 April to 18 April 2010.

Medal overview

Men

Women

Medals table

References

External links
 

A
African Judo Championships
African Judo Championships
International sports competitions hosted by Cameroon
African Judo Championships, 2010
Sport in Yaoundé
21st century in Yaoundé
Judo competitions in Cameroon
April 2010 sports events in Africa
Events in Yaoundé